XARA is an acronym for "Unauthorized Cross-App Resource Access", which describes a category of zero-day vulnerabilities in computer software systems.

Initial Disclosure
An academic research paper entitled  "Unauthorized Cross-App Resource Access on MAC OS X and iOS". was published on 26 May 2015 by a team of researchers from Indiana University, Tsinghua University, Peking University, Chinese Academy of Sciences, and Georgia Institute of Technology. The paper was widely released to the public on 16 June 2015
 and commented on by both mainstream and technical media outlets.

The paper identifies a number of separate categories of zero day threats to applications and stored passwords which can potentially be exploited by malware on iOS devices and  OS X.  The paper also discloses the existence of similar vulnerabilities on Android devices.

Response by Vendors
 On 19 June 2015, Apple Computer responded to the press that they had implemented countermeasures to exclude malware containing the XARA exploit from their iOS App Store.

Attack Vectors

In XARA each attack vector violates the principles of a computer security sandbox.
  
  Untrusted partners using shared resources such file system, keychain.
 Inter-process communication without verification of partner.
 Weak security policies of system installer allow other applications to be designated as shared resource bundles.

Known systems with problems

 iOS from Apple Computer
 OS X from Apple Computer
 Android from Google

See also
 Targeted attacks
 Access Control
 Software-defined protection
 Sandbox (computer security)
 Vector (malware)

References

Computer network security
Types of malware